Rex Libris is a science fiction / humor comic book series written and illustrated by James Turner. It was published quarterly from 2005–2008 by Slave Labor Graphics.

Publication history
Thirteen issues were published from August 2005 to October 2008.
 Rex Libris #1 (August 2005): "I, Librarian"
 Rex Libris #2 (November 2005): "Labyrinth of Literature"
 Rex Libris #3 (February 2006): "Leap of Faith"
 Rex Libris #4 (May 2006): "Battle on Benzine!"
 Rex Libris #5 (August 2006): "Tea with Vaglox"
 Rex Libris #6 (November 2006): "Book of Monsters"
 Rex Libris #7 (February 2007): "Monster Merry-go-Round!"
 Rex Libris #8 (May 2007): "Escape From the Book of Monsters"
 Rex Libris #9 (August 2007): "In the Grip of OGPU!"
 Rex Libris #10 (January 2008): "A Cock and Bull Story"
 Rex Libris #11 (April 2008): "R'lyeh Rising"
 Rex Libris #12 (August 2008): "Space Balls... of Evil!"
 Rex Libris #13 (October 2008): "Convergence of Chaos"

A trade paperback, Rex Libris: I, Librarian, was published in 2007. It collects the first five issues of the series, plus an unpublished short story, "Rex versus the Red Baron!" A second trade paperback, Rex Libris: Book of Monsters, was published in 2009. It collects the last eight issues.

Series overview
The series follows the adventures of Rex Libris, the Head Librarian at the Middleton Public Library. Unbeknownst to the general public, Rex is actually over a thousand years old, and was the original librarian at the Library of Alexandria. He is a member of the Ordo Biblioteca, a secret international society of librarians. With the aid of the ancient god Thoth, who lives beneath the Library, Rex travels to the farthest reaches of the universe to collect late book fees, and to fight the powers of ignorance and darkness.

Film adaptation
In April, 2007, Warner Bros. announced that they had hired Mark Burton (Madagascar) to write the script for a film adaptation of Rex Libris. The producer of the film is Mosaic Media. In 2012, Walden Media acquired the rights and hired Ben Zazove to write the script.

Notes

External links 
 Rex Libris preview at Slave Labor Graphics website
 

2005 comics debuts
Slave Labor Graphics titles
Libris, Rex
2008 comics endings